Jitendra Kumar Soni (29 November 1981) is an Indian civil servant, and a Rajasthani and Hindi writer and translator.

Life and career
Soni obtained an M.A. in political science, philosophy and public policy and obtained his PhD in political science from Rajasthan University, Jaipur. 

He writes in multiple languages including Hindi, Punjabi, and Rajasthani. He has published more than 10 novels, short stories, and collections. He was awarded the Sahitya Academy Yuva Puruskar in 2016 for his work Rankhaar. He received the civilian lifesaving award Jeevan Raksha Padak for saving 8 lives. He has been selected in top 10 IAS officers by The Better India.

Soni was district collector for Jalore district in Rajasthan in 2014, and initiated a programme to sanitation, education and health in the district through community involvement. By 2016, Soni had moved to Jhalawar district, where he served as collector and district magistrate until December 2018. Soni initiated a campaign to improve access for disabled people in Jhalawar district; ramps and railings were made mandatory in new government buildings; in December 2016, he said that the district planned to start kiosks for disabled people in old government buildings where there was insufficient space for improving disabled access. 

In December 2018, Soni was appointed project director for the Rajasthan Urban Infrastructure Development Project (RUIDP) of the Government of Rajasthan.

It was announced on 4 July 2020 that he had been appointed the next collector of Nagaur district in Rajasthan. After posting in Nagaur district District collector, Soni initiated ‘Abhiyaan Ujaas’ to electrify nearly 1000 non-electrified government schools  with help of local donators and CSR funds. This model is being replicated in whole Rajasthan as per direction of Chief Minister Rajasthan to electrify 11,154 government schools of Rajasthan. Soni took an initiative  "Rasta Kholo Abhiyaan" to remove encroachments and provide ways to farmers to access their agricultural lands. More than four thousands such ways or Rasta were made accessible, encroachment free and recorded. Soni started special campaign to make educational institute tobacco free. This was appreciated by chief minister and decision was made to roll out in whole state.

On 7 January 2022 Abhiyaan Silicosis Care of Nagaur district has been awarded the 24th National e-Governance Award in the category of 'Excellence in Government Process Re-engineering for Digital Transformation'. This award was presented to District Collector Dr. Jitendra Kumar Soni and his team in the 24th National Conference held in Hyderabad.

It was announced on 16 January 2022 that he had been appointed as Mission Director, NATIONAL HEALTH MISSION (NHM) AND EX-OFFICIO JOINT SECRETARY TO GOVERNMENT, MEDICAL, HEALTH AND FAMILY WELFARE, RAJASTHAN, JAIPUR.

It was announced on 4 July 2022 that he had been appointed the next collector of Alwar district in Rajasthan.

Dr. Soni is awarded with "Rastrapati Nagrik Suraksha Padak" on August 15th, 2022.

Literary works

Books
 Bharkhama, Rajasthani Kahani Sangrah

 Regmal, Hindi Poetry Collection
 Rankhaar, Rajasthani Poetry  
ADIOS, Dhai Aakhar Ki Dhai Kahaniyan, Hindi Short stories]
 Yadavri, Diary
 Umeedon Ke Chirag  Hindi Poetry Collection

Books edited
Kavita Paraspar, poetry collection
Shabdon Ki Seep, poetry collection

Books translated
म्हारे पांति रा पाना , Rajasthani translation of Punjabi book by Haribhajan Singh Renu
देहरा माय आज ही उगै है आपन रूंख , Rajasthani translation of English short stories by Ruskin Bond
Nirwana , Hindi translation of Punjabi novel written by Manmohan Singh

See also

References

External links
Kavitakosh
 Kavishala_Talks

Indian civil servants
1981 births
Living people